In abstract algebra, a branch of pure mathematics, an MV-algebra is an algebraic structure with a binary operation , a unary operation , and the constant , satisfying certain axioms. MV-algebras are the algebraic semantics of Łukasiewicz logic; the letters MV refer to the many-valued logic of Łukasiewicz. MV-algebras coincide with the class of bounded commutative BCK algebras.

Definitions
An MV-algebra is an algebraic structure  consisting of
 a non-empty set 
 a binary operation  on 
 a constant  denoting a fixed element of 
which satisfies the following identities:
 
 
 
 
  and
 

By virtue of the first three axioms,  is a commutative monoid. Being defined by identities, MV-algebras form a variety of algebras. The variety of MV-algebras is a subvariety of the variety of BL-algebras and contains all Boolean algebras.

An MV-algebra can equivalently be defined (Hájek 1998) as a prelinear commutative bounded integral residuated lattice  satisfying the additional identity

Examples of MV-algebras

The trivial MV-algebra has the only element 0 and the operations defined in the only possible way,  and 

In fact adding the axiom  to the axioms defining an MV-algebra results in an axiomatization of Boolean algebras.

Another important example is Chang's MV-algebra, consisting just of infinitesimals (with the order type ω) and their co-infinitesimals.

Chang also constructed an MV-algebra from an arbitrary totally ordered abelian group G by fixing a positive element u and defining the segment [0, u] as { x ∈ G | 0 ≤ x ≤ u }, which becomes an MV-algebra with x ⊕ y = min(u, x + y) and ¬x = u − x. Furthermore, Chang showed that every linearly ordered MV-algebra is isomorphic to an MV-algebra constructed from a group in this way.

Daniele Mundici extended the above construction to abelian lattice-ordered groups. If G is such a group with strong (order) unit u, then the "unit interval" { x ∈ G | 0 ≤ x ≤ u } can be equipped with ¬x = u − x, x ⊕ y = u ∧G (x + y), and x ⊗ y = 0 ∨G (x + y − u). This construction establishes a categorical equivalence between lattice-ordered abelian groups with strong unit and MV-algebras.

An effect algebra that is lattice-ordered and has the Riesz decomposition property is an MV-algebra. Conversely, any MV-algebra is a lattice-ordered effect algebra with the Riesz decomposition property.

Relation to Łukasiewicz logic
C. C. Chang devised MV-algebras to study many-valued logics, introduced by Jan Łukasiewicz in 1920. In particular, MV-algebras form the algebraic semantics of Łukasiewicz logic, as described below.

If the standard MV-algebra over [0,1] is employed, the set of all [0,1]-tautologies determines so-called infinite-valued Łukasiewicz logic.

Chang's (1958, 1959) completeness theorem states that any MV-algebra equation holding in the standard MV-algebra over the interval [0,1] will hold in every MV-algebra. Algebraically, this means that the standard MV-algebra generates the variety of all MV-algebras. Equivalently, Chang's completeness theorem says that MV-algebras characterize infinite-valued Łukasiewicz logic, defined as the set of [0,1]-tautologies.

The way the [0,1] MV-algebra characterizes all possible MV-algebras parallels the well-known fact that identities holding in the two-element Boolean algebra hold in all possible Boolean algebras. Moreover, MV-algebras characterize infinite-valued Łukasiewicz logic in a manner analogous to the way that Boolean algebras characterize classical bivalent logic (see Lindenbaum–Tarski algebra).

In 1984, Font, Rodriguez and Torrens introduced the Wajsberg algebra as an alternative model for the infinite-valued Łukasiewicz logic. Wajsberg algebras and MV-algebras are term-equivalent.

MVn-algebras 

In the 1940s Grigore Moisil introduced his Łukasiewicz–Moisil algebras (LMn-algebras) in the hope of giving algebraic semantics for the (finitely) n-valued Łukasiewicz logic. However, in 1956 Alan Rose discovered that for n ≥ 5, the Łukasiewicz–Moisil algebra does not model the Łukasiewicz n-valued logic. Although C. C. Chang published his MV-algebra in 1958, it is a faithful model only for the ℵ0-valued (infinitely-many-valued) Łukasiewicz–Tarski logic. For the axiomatically more complicated (finitely) n-valued Łukasiewicz logics, suitable algebras were published in 1977 by Revaz Grigolia and called MVn-algebras. MVn-algebras are a subclass of LMn-algebras; the inclusion is strict for n ≥ 5.

The MVn-algebras are MV-algebras that satisfy some additional axioms, just like the n-valued Łukasiewicz logics have additional axioms added to the ℵ0-valued logic.

In 1982 Roberto Cignoli published some additional constraints that added to LMn-algebras yield proper models for n-valued Łukasiewicz logic; Cignoli called his discovery proper n-valued Łukasiewicz algebras. The LMn-algebras that are also MVn-algebras are precisely Cignoli’s proper n-valued Łukasiewicz algebras.

Relation to functional analysis

MV-algebras were related by Daniele Mundici to approximately finite-dimensional C*-algebras by establishing a bijective correspondence between all isomorphism classes of approximately finite-dimensional C*-algebras with lattice-ordered dimension group and all isomorphism classes of countable MV algebras. Some instances of this correspondence include:

In software

There are multiple frameworks implementing fuzzy logic (type II), and most of them implement what has been called a multi-adjoint logic. This is no more than the implementation of an MV-algebra.

References

Chang, C. C. (1958) "Algebraic analysis of many-valued logics," Transactions of the American Mathematical Society 88: 476–490.
------ (1959) "A new proof of the completeness of the Lukasiewicz axioms," Transactions of the American Mathematical Society 88: 74–80. 
 Cignoli, R. L. O., D'Ottaviano, I. M. L., Mundici, D. (2000) Algebraic Foundations of Many-valued Reasoning. Kluwer.
 Di Nola A., Lettieri A. (1993) "Equational characterization of all varieties of MV-algebras," Journal of Algebra 221: 463–474 .
 Hájek, Petr (1998) Metamathematics of Fuzzy Logic. Kluwer.
 Mundici, D.: Interpretation of AF C*-algebras in Łukasiewicz sentential calculus. J. Funct. Anal. 65, 15–63 (1986)

Further reading 
 Daniele Mundici, MV-ALGEBRAS. A short tutorial
 
 Mundici, D. The C*-Algebras of Three-Valued Logic. Logic Colloquium  ’88, Proceedings of the Colloquium held in Padova 61–77 (1989). 
 Cabrer, L. M. & Mundici, D. A Stone-Weierstrass theorem for MV-algebras and unital ℓ-groups. Journal of Logic and Computation (2014). 
 Olivia Caramello, Anna Carla Russo (2014) The Morita-equivalence between MV-algebras and abelian ℓ-groups with strong unit

External links
 Stanford Encyclopedia of Philosophy: " Many-valued logic"—by Siegfried Gottwald.

Algebraic logic
Algebraic structures
Fuzzy logic
Many-valued logic